Rail Coach Factory at Kapurthala is a coach manufacturing unit of the Indian Railways in the state of Punjab. It is located on the Jalandhar-Firozpur railway line.

History
Established in 1985, RCF is a coach manufacturing unit of Indian Railways. It has manufactured more than 30000 passenger coaches of different types including self-propelled passenger vehicles which constitute over 50% of the total population of coaches on Indian Railways. It is a production unit with a target of 1025 coaches per year.

Some of them are:
 'Tejas' high-speed coach (only by RCF Kapurthala for Indian Railway)
 Non-AC general coach (BG/MG)
 Non-AC luggage-cum-brake van (BG/MG)
 Refrigerated parcel van (BG)
 Accident relief train (BG)

Production

This output constitutes over 35% of the total population of coaches on Indian Railways. The Rail Coach Factory (RCF) has produced a record number of coaches in the financial year 2013–14, as it reached the mark of 1701 coaches against installed capacity of 1500 per annum. During the year RCF produced 23 different variants of coaches for high-speed trains like Rajdhani, Shatabdi, double-decker and other trains. The factory in association with DRDE also developed a highly cost-effective indigenous technology for the treatment of biowaste in coaches. Around 2096 bio-toilets have been fitted in 2013–14.

The factory is also manufacturing 120 Linke-Hofmann-Busch (LHB) coaches to be exported to Bangladesh at an estimated cost of Rs 367 crore, with the first consignment of 40 set to be dispatched in March 2016. The factory has already exported coaches to South East Asian and African countries which have Metre Gauge rail networks and Indian Railways' past experience in Meter Gauge rolling stock has proved handy in serving these markets.

See also 
 Diesel Locomotive Factory, Marhowrah
 Electric Locomotive Factory, Madhepura
 Chittaranjan Locomotive Works, Asansol
 Banaras Locomotive Works, Varanasi
 Integral Coach Factory, Chennai
 Modern Coach Factory, Raebareli
 Rail Wheel Plant, Bela
 Rail Wheel Factory, Yelahanka
 Titagarh Wagons, Titagarh
 List of locomotive builders by countries

References

External links
 

Coach and wagon manufacturers of India
Kapurthala
Economy of Punjab, India
1986 establishments in Punjab, India